Utah State Route 134 (SR-134) is a state highway in the state of Utah that connects the cities of West Haven, West Weber, Plain City, Farr West, Pleasant View, and North Ogden over a distance of  in western and northern Weber County.

Route description
State Route 134 begins in the community of Kanesville (incorporated as part of the city of West Haven) as 4700 West, at its intersection with SR-37 (4000 South). From this point, it travels straight north for about  through West Weber and into Plain City. Shortly thereafter, the route makes another jog to the east and the north before finally leaving Plain City eastward on 2600 North. The route continues eastward for its final , passing through Farr West, passing under I-15 at an interchange and intersecting US-89  later, and continuing through Pleasant View before ending in North Ogden at its intersection with SR-235 (Washington Boulevard).

History
The road from Kanesville north to Plain City was first established a federal aid project in 1933, and designated a state highway in 1935 as State Route 40. The route was extended from Plain City eastward to Pleasant View in 1969. State Route 40 was renumbered to State Route 134, its current designation, in the 1977 Utah state route renumbering. The route remained unchanged until 2004, when the newly constructed roadway of 2700 North in North Ogden provided an extension to the route, taking it east to Washington Boulevard. In the process, the older road it replaced (2550 North) which had been designated as part of SR-235, was returned to local control with SR-235 being extended north  along Washington Boulevard to meet the new terminus of SR-134.

Major intersections

References

134
 134